Frank Giletti (born March 1, 1973) is a French civil servant and politician of the National Rally. He has served as a deputy in the National Assembly representing Var's 6th constituency since 2022.

He is also the regional secretary of the National Rally in Var.

Biography
Giletti was born in Évreux. He is a senior civil servant in the department of overseas education and was variously based in Lebanon and the United Arab Emirates. He worked as the director and head administrator of the French Protestant College of Beirut and then the Lycée Louis Massignon in Abu Dhabi.

He first joined the National Rally (then called the National Front) at the age of 18 and was elected as a municipal councilor in Toulon in 2001 before becoming a regional councilor in Puget-sur-Argens.

During the 2022 French legislative election, Giletti contested the seat of Var's 6th constituency and unseated LREM deputy Valérie Gomez-Bassac.

See also 

 List of deputies of the 16th National Assembly of France

References 

Living people
1973 births
Deputies of the 16th National Assembly of the French Fifth Republic
21st-century French politicians
Members of Parliament for Var
National Rally (France) politicians